Monstera standleyana, the five holes plant is a species of flowering plant from family Araceae which can be found in Costa Rica, Honduras, Nicaragua, and Panama.  It was described by G.S. Bunting in 1967.

References

Flora of Central America
Plants described in 1967
standleyana